The 2004–05 season was the 73rd season in the history of Real Zaragoza and the club's second consecutive season in the top flight of Spanish football. In addition to the domestic league, Real Zaragoza participated in this season's editions of the Copa del Rey, the Supercopa de España and the UEFA Cup.

Players

First-team squad

Pre-season and friendlies

Competitions

Overall record

La Liga

League table

Results summary

Results by round

Matches

Copa del Rey

Supercopa de España

UEFA Cup

First round

Group stage

The group stage draw was held on 5 October 2004.

Knockout stage

Round of 32

Round of 16

References

Real Zaragoza seasons
Real Zaragoza